Dr. Bernard MacMahon (1680–27 May 1747) was Bishop of Clogher 1727–1737 and Archbishop of Armagh 1738–1747.

MacMahon was appointed as Roman Catholic Bishop of Clogher on 17 August 1727, following the death of his predecessor, Hugh MacMahon. Bernard MacMahon was transferred to the position of Archbishop of Armagh on 8 November 1737. In 1741, he would go into hiding as a result of him not promoting a priest to a parish; this would result in a warrant being issued for his arrest. He died in Armagh on 27 May 1747.

See also
Roman Catholic Diocese of Clogher

References

Roman Catholic bishops of Clogher
1680 births
1747 deaths
People from County Monaghan
18th-century Roman Catholic bishops in Ireland
Roman Catholic archbishops of Armagh